St. Antony's Church, Chemmanvilai is a Roman Catholic Church located in Kanyakumari district, Tamil Nadu, India. 

St. Antony's Church, located right in the middle of the Chemmanvilai village, is an important worship center that plays an important role in the lives of the local people.  The church is under the control of the Roman Catholic Diocese of Kuzhithurai. 

On 25 December 1942, Rev Fr. Mathias of Madathattuvilai Parish helped to establish the small church and hold the first mass there. The first annual festival was held on 11 April 1943.

A second church was established by Bishop Agniswami T.R. on 20 December 1970. Bishop Peter Remigius of Kottar Diocese announced the church as a new parish on 22 June 2011 and the first priest was Rev Fr. Joakins. A.

Gallery

References

Churches in Kanyakumari district
Roman Catholic churches in Tamil Nadu
Roman Catholic churches in Kuzhithurai Diocese